Kotonowaka Terumasa (born May 15, 1968, as Mitsuya Konno) is a former sumo wrestler from Obanazawa, Yamagata prefecture, Japan. He made his professional debut in 1984 and after reaching the top makuuchi division in 1990 he remained there for 15 years until his retirement in 2005. His highest rank was sekiwake and he earned seven special prizes and eight gold stars during his long makuuchi career. He is now the head coach of Sadogatake stable.

Career
At junior high school he practiced judo and shot put, and even represented his prefecture at the All Tohoku Shot put Championships. He was scouted into sumo by a supporter of Sadogatake stable. He had intended to join in March 1984 alongside Kotonishiki, but failed the physical because of high blood pressure, delaying his entry by two months.

At first he wrestled under the name Imano and then Kotokonno before finally settling on Kotonowaka in 1988. It took him six years to achieve sekitori status by reaching the jūryō division in July 1990. He first reached makuuchi in November 1990 and remained continuously in the top division from March 1991. He advanced several times into the san'yaku ranks, first making komusubi in September 1993. However he had to wait until January 1999 to achieve his highest rank of sekiwake, following a strong 10-5 showing at komusubi the previous November.

Kotonowaka never won a tournament, but he nevertheless earned eight kinboshi or gold stars for victories against yokozuna while a maegashira, with three such wins coming against Takanohana.  He defeated Asashoryu twice as a yokozuna, and also looked to have defeated him in July 2004, but the judges controversially called for a rematch after deciding that Asashoryu had in fact not hit the ground before Kotonowaka touched down. Kotonowaka lost the rematch, but NHK received calls from viewers saying that Asashoryu was shini-tai ("dead body") and should have lost the first bout. He also received five Fighting Spirit and two Outstanding Achievement prizes in the course of his long career, the first coming in July 1995, nearly five years after his top division debut. He was ranked in the top division for 90 tournaments, which is the eighth best in history, and he was one of only a handful of wrestlers to win over 600 top division bouts. He was relatively injury-free until March 2000, when he suffered a serious injury to his left knee in training which was to bother him for the rest of his career. He injured the knee again in November 2003 and was the last wrestler to be able to take advantage of the kosho seido (public injury) system before its abolition, sitting out the January 2004 tournament without affecting his ranking.

His good looks meant he was popular with female sumo fans.

Fighting style

Kotonowaka relied strongly on countering techniques against his opponents, and his bouts were often relatively long as compared to most other wrestlers. This proclivity led to him receiving the nickname "Mr. Ippun" ("Mr. One-Minute"). He favoured a migi-yotsu (left hand outside, right hand inside) grip on his opponent's mawashi. His speciality was uwatenage, or the overarm throw, which he used to win over 20 percent of his matches (the average is only 7 percent).

Retirement from sumo
During the 2005 November tournament, in which, at 37, he was the oldest rikishi in his division, he announced his retirement. He took over immediately as stable master of Sadogatake stable, as the previous head, former yokozuna Kotozakura, had reached the mandatory retirement age of 65. Kotonowaka had been in line to inherit the stable ever since he had married Kotozakura's daughter in March 1996, and changed his legal name from Mitsuya Konno to Mitsuya Kamatani.

Kotonowaka oversaw the promotion of Kotomitsuki to ōzeki in July 2007, and Kotoōshū's first top division championship in May 2008. The first wrestler from his stable to be promoted to the top division since he took over was Kotokasuga, also in May 2008. He produced his first new sekitori, Kotokuni, in January 2009, followed by Kotoyutaka in July 2009, although neither were able to maintain a position in jūryō .

In July 2010 Kotomitsuki was dismissed from sumo for illegal betting on professional baseball, and Sadogatake was punished for his lack of supervision of his top wrestler by being demoted two ranks in the Japan Sumo Association's hierarchy.
 
In 2011 Sadogatake saw Kotoyūki reach the sekitori ranks, and Kotoshōgiku was promoted to ōzeki, the first Japanese wrestler to reach the rank since Kotomitsuki. Kotoyūki became his first makuuchi debutant in January 2013. Since then Kotoekō, Kotoshōhō and his own son, also known as Kotonowaka, have reached makuuchi. 

In March 2022 Sadogatake was elected to the Japan Sumo Association's board of directors. In January 2023 he took over as the head of the judging department following the resignation of Isegahama.

Family
Kotonowaka's son Masakatsu Kamatani was born in November 1997, and in November 2015 joined Sadogatake stable using the fighting name Kotokamatani. He won the jonokuchi championship in January 2016 and reached the makushita division in September 2016. Following the May 2019 tournament he was promoted to the second jūryō division, adopting his fathers’ shikona Kotonowaka. It is understood that he will inherit his grandfather's shikona of Kotozakura if he reaches the ōzeki rank.

Career record

See also
Glossary of sumo terms
List of past sumo wrestlers
List of sumo elders
List of sumo record holders
List of sekiwake

References

External links

1968 births
Living people
Japanese sumo wrestlers
Sumo people from Yamagata Prefecture
Sekiwake
Sadogatake stable sumo wrestlers